Ferlut SH. a. is a company based in Tirana, Albania. It operates the Unaza busline in Tirana. It has a workforce of 300.

References

Transport companies of Albania
Road transport in Albania